Nagaon Express (earlier Tambaram–Silghat Town Express), is a weekly Express train belonging to Northeast Frontier Railway zone of Indian Railways that connects Silghat Town of Assam and  in the South Indian metropolis of Chennai, Tamil Nadu.
The train was extended to Tambaram on a trial basis from August 2017. The train was also extended from Guwahati to Silghat Town.

Time-Table 
Train No. 15629 from Tambaram to Silghat Town. 
The train leaves Tambaram (TBM) on every Monday at 9:45 P.M. and arrives Silghat Town (SHTT) on Thursday at 9:45 A.M. traversing a distance of 2965 kilometers in 60 hours.

Train no. 15630 from Silghat Town to Tambaram. 
The train leaves Silghat Town (SHTT) on every Friday at 8:30 A.M. and arrives Tambaram (TBM) on Sunday at 20:50 P.M. traversing a distance of 2965 kilometres in 60 hours & 20 minutes.

Major halts
The train travels the total distance of 2798 kilometres in 55 hours. The major halts of this train are as follows-

TAMIL NADU (02 stops)
  (Starts)
 .

ANDHRA PRADESH (06 stops)
  
  
 
 
 
 .

ODISHA (05 stops)

 
 
 
 
 .

WEST BENGAL (17 stops)

 
 
 
 
 
 
 
 
 
 
 
 
 New Jalpaiguri (Siliguri)
 
 
 
 .

JHARKHAND (02 stops)

 
 .

BIHAR (02 stops)
 
 .

ASSAM (13 stops)
 
 
 
 
 
 
 Jagiroad
 
 Senchoa
 Nagaon
 Amoni
 Jakhalabandha
 Silghat (Ends).

Note: Bold letters indicates Major Railway Stations/Major Cities.

Traction

 

See also
Dibrugarh–Tambaram Express
Chennai–New Jalpaiguri SF Express
Guwahati–Bengaluru Cantt. Superfast Express
Thiruvananthapuram–Silchar Superfast Express
New Tinsukia–Bengaluru Express

References

Transport in Chennai
Transport in Guwahati
Express trains in India
Rail transport in Assam
Rail transport in West Bengal
Rail transport in Tamil Nadu
Rail transport in Andhra Pradesh